Herbert Paul "Babe" Barna (March 2, 1915 – May 18, 1972) was a left fielder in Major League Baseball who played for the Philadelphia Athletics (1937–1938), New York Giants (1941–1943) and Boston Red Sox (1943). Barna batted left-handed and threw right-handed. He was born in Clarksburg, West Virginia, and attended West Virginia University, where he played football, basketball and college baseball for the Mountaineers from 1935–1937.

In a five-season career, Barna was a .232 hitter with 12 home runs and 96 RBI in 207 games played.
He was inducted into the West Virginia University Sports Hall of Fame in 1996.

Barna died in Charleston, West Virginia, at the age of  57.

References

External links

The Baseball Page

1915 births
1972 deaths
Albany Senators players
Baltimore Orioles (IL) players
Baseball players from West Virginia
Boston Red Sox players
Charleston Senators players
Chattanooga Lookouts players
Louisville Colonels (minor league) players
Major League Baseball left fielders
Nashville Vols players
New York Giants (NL) players
Memphis Chickasaws players
Minneapolis Millers (baseball) players
Philadelphia Athletics players
Sportspeople from Clarksburg, West Virginia
Toledo Mud Hens players
West Virginia Mountaineers baseball players
Williamsport Grays players